The 1995 U.S. Figure Skating Championships took place between February 7 and 11, 1995 in Providence, Rhode Island. Medals were awarded in four colors: gold (first), silver (second), bronze (third), and pewter (fourth) in four disciplines – men's singles, ladies' singles, pair skating, and ice dancing – across three levels: senior, junior, and novice.

Medalists

Senior

Senior results

Men

Ladies

Pairs

Ice dancing

Junior results

Men

Ladies
Vogel won gold after placing first in both segments. In the free skating, six of nine judges placed Vogel first and two voted for Lipinski.

Pairs

Ice dancing

Novice results

Men

Ladies

Pairs

Ice dancing

References

External links
 NYT report Ladies 1, Pairs, Ice dance
 NYT report Ladies 2
 NYT report Men's
 men's and ladies' results

U.S. Figure Skating Championships
Sports in Providence, Rhode Island
United States Figure Skating Championships, 1995
United States Figure Skating Championships, 1995
1995 in sports in Rhode Island
February 1995 sports events in the United States